"Love Me Forever" is a popular song by The Four Esquires. It features orchestral backing by Sid Bass with a female session vocalist and peaked at #25 on the Billboard Hot 100 in 1957. It also reached #23 on the UK Singles Chart.

Tracks

A	Love Me Forever 2:26
B      I Ain't Been Right Since You Left 2:12

Other recordings
 Denny Dennis - Embassy Single WB273.
 Eydie Gormé - reached the No. 24 position in the Billboard charts in 1957 and No. 21 spot in the UK charts in 1958.
 Marion Ryan - reached the No. 5 spot in the UK charts in 1958.

References

American pop songs
1957 singles
1957 songs